Killdozer, a portmanteau of kill and bulldozer, may refer to:

 "Killdozer!" (short story), a 1944 short story by Theodore Sturgeon
 Killdozer! (film), a 1974 ABC cult classic sci-fi film based on the story
 Killdozer (band), an American noise rock band named after the film
 The nickname given to a modified bulldozer used in a 2004 rampage by Marvin Heemeyer
 An armored bulldozer